Takaya is both a Japanese surname and a masculine Japanese given name. Notable people with the name include:

As surname
, a Japanese mixed martial artist
, the pen name of a Japanese manga artist best known for creating the series Fruits Basket
, a Japanese manga artist best known for creating the series Guyver

As given name
 Takaya Imamura, co-director of the Nintendo 3DS game Tank Troopers
, Japanese baseball player
, a Japanese actor
, a former Japanese sumo wrestler
, a Japanese actor and voice actor
, a retired Japanese football player who last played for Albirex Niigata and who was part of the Japanese 2004 Olympic football team
, Japanese footballer
 Takaya Tsubobayashi (born 1971), a Japanese race car driver

Fictional characters
 Takaya Aiba, the main character of the anime series Tekkaman Blade (released as Teknoman in the United States and Australia, with the character's name changed to "Nick Carter")
 Takaya Mizushima, a character in the manga and anime series Shadow Star (known as Narutaru in Japan)
 Takaya Sakaki, an antagonist in Persona 3
 Takaya Noriko, one of the main female character of Gainax series "Gunbuster" 

Japanese-language surnames
Japanese masculine given names